Curtis Trent (born July 4, 1983) is an American politician who served in the Missouri House of Representatives from the 133rd district from 2017 to 2023, and is now serving in the Missouri Senate from district 20.

Electoral History

State Representative

State Senate

References

1983 births
Living people
Republican Party members of the Missouri House of Representatives
21st-century American politicians